The Big Golden Guitar is one of the many "big" attractions that can be found around Australia. Located in Tamworth, New South Wales, the monument is one of the best-known points of interest in New England. 

It is also a major attraction during the Tamworth Country Music Festival.

History
The Golden Guitar was erected in front of the Longyard Hotel on Sydney Road in 1988. It was unveiled by the country music artist, Slim Dusty. Its location in Tamworth is symbolic of the city's recognition and celebration of Australian country music, and its artists.

An annual award ceremony takes place where miniature Golden Guitars are given as awards to artists and musicians in recognition of their achievements and contributions in the genre of country music. An estimated 3.6 million photographs have been taken of the site since its opening.

In 2018, the Tamworth Visitor Information Centre at the Big Golden Guitar Tourist Centre had 117,000 visitors, and the Council intends to increase visitor numbers. Long-term planning of the site will eventually see a National Guitar Museum established at the site along with a cafe for the tourists.

Design
The Golden Guitar stand approximately 12 metres high and weighs over 500 kilograms. It is constructed out of fibreglass and wood, with steel reinforcements. The Golden Guitar has no strings because it was modeled directly on the Golden Guitar trophies given to winners at the Country Music Awards of Australia ceremony night during the Tamworth Country Music Festival.

See also

Australia's big things
List of world's largest roadside attractions

References

External links
Official website

Australian country music
Tamworth, New South Wales
Big things in New South Wales
Individual guitars